The inaugural West Midlands mayoral election was held on 4 May 2017 to elect the Mayor of the West Midlands, with subsequent elections to be held every four years from May 2020. The election took place alongside five elections for English metro mayors and other local elections, and ahead of the general election on 8 June 2017.

The contest was the first election for a governing body covering the entire West Midlands since the 1981 West Midlands County Council election, the former West Midlands County Council having been dissolved in 1986. Police and crime commissioner elections had taken in 2012, 2014 and 2016 with Labour winning those contests decisively.

The election was won by Conservative Andy Street, beating Labour's Siôn Simon in the final round by 50.4% to 49.6% with a turnout of 26.7%. The result was seen as a shock in what has been considered a Labour heartland.

Results

Background 

In 2012, a referendum on a proposal to have an elected mayor for the city of Birmingham resulted in a 57.8% vote against.

Following a devolution deal between the UK government and the West Midlands Combined Authority (WMCA), it was agreed to introduce a directly-elected mayor for the combined authority, with an initial election to be held in May 2017. The Cities and Local Government Devolution Act 2016 required a directly-elected metro mayor for combined authorities to receive additional powers from central government.

The mayor would be elected by voters in the metropolitan boroughs of Birmingham, Coventry, Dudley, Sandwell, Solihull, Walsall, and Wolverhampton, and act as chair of the combined authority as well exercise additional powers and functions devolved from central government relating to transport and housing and planning. The WMCA would also as a result receive further powers over economic growth, adult skills funding, employment, and business support.

Electoral system 

The supplementary vote system was used for the mayoral election. Voters were able to express a first and second preference on their ballots. If no candidate receives 50% of valid votes cast in the first round, the two candidates with the most votes proceed to the second round while all other candidates are eliminated. Any valid second preferences of eliminated candidates are redistributed to the remaining candidates, and the candidate with the most combined votes in the second round is declared the winner.

Eligible electors are registered to vote by 13 April 2017; British, Commonwealth or European Union citizens; aged 18 or over by 4 May 2017; and resident in the seven boroughs that make up the West Midlands Combined Authority (Birmingham, Coventry Dudley, Sandwell, Solihull, Walsall, and Wolverhampton).

On 27 April it was confirmed 1,961,153 people were eligible to vote in the mayoral election.

Candidates
Candidates are required to be aged 18 or over and be a British, Commonwealth or European Union citizen. In addition they should fulfill one of the following: be registered to vote in the WMCA area; own or occupy land in the area for 12 months before their nomination; work in the WMCA for 12 months before their nomination; or have lived in the WMCA during the 12 months before their nomination.

Candidates are also required to present 100 signatures of people on the electoral register, with 10 from each constituent authority, and provide a £5,000 deposit to be returned if the candidate receives more than 5% in the first round.

Six candidates were successfully nominated by the deadline on 4 April 2017. They were James Burn of the Green Party; Pete Durnell of UKIP; Beverley Nielson of the Liberal Democrats; Siôn Simon, who received the nominations of the Labour Party and the Co-operative Party; Graham Stevenson of the Communist Party of Britain; and Andy Street of the Conservative Party.

The first mayoral debate took place at the Black Country Living Museum on 7 March 2017  with five of the candidates represented.

Candidate selections

Communist Party of Britain
Graham Stevenson was announced as the Communist Party of Britain's candidate on 8 March 2017. Stevenson is a former official for the T&G trade union (now Unite the Union) and sits on his party's national executive committee.

Conservative Party
On 7 July 2016 it was confirmed Andy Street, the former managing director of John Lewis and former chair of the Greater Birmingham and Solihull Local Enterprise Partnership, would seek the Conservative Party's nomination for West Midlands Mayor. After no others came forward and a meeting of local members on 29 September, Street was announced as the party's candidate. Street's endorsements include that of former CBI director Lord Digby Jones.

Street defended spending up to £1 million before the regulated campaign period where spending was restricted to £130,000 in the final five weeks.

Co-operative Party 
The Co-operative Party nominated Siôn Simon, MEP for the West Midlands and former MP for Birmingham Erdington, as its candidate in April 2017. The party has stood joint candidates with Labour since 1927.

Green Party of England and Wales
On 18 October 2016, James Burn was announced as the Green Party's candidate. Burn is a Green Party councillor for Chelmsley Wood and leader of the opposition on Solihull Council.

Labour Party

In January 2016, Labour's national executive committee agreed to select the party's candidate in July through a one-member-one-vote ballot. It was suggested candidates for the post could include West Midlands MEP Siôn Simon, Hodge Hill MP Liam Byrne, Dudley North MP Ian Austin and Sandwell council leader Darren Cooper. Edgbaston MP Gisela Stuart declined to enter.

Five candidates came forward by the 10 June deadline. They were Steve Bedser, a former cabinet member for Health and Wellbeing on Birmingham City Council; Najma Hafeez, a former Birmingham city councillor and chair of City Hospital; Milkinder Jaspal, a cabinet member on Wolverhampton City Council; Siôn Simon, an MEP for the West Midlands, former MP for Birmingham Erdington and former government minister for creative industries and further education; and Mary Simons-Jones, a freelance bookseller.

Bedser and Simon were shortlisted and went to a ballot among party members in Birmingham, Coventry, Dudley, Sandwell, Solihull, Walsall, and Wolverhampton.

On 9 August 2016 it was announced Simon had won the ballot with 2,718 votes to 1,099 for Bedser.

Liberal Democrats
The Liberal Democrats announced Beverley Nielsen, a businesswoman and director of Birmingham City University, as their candidate on 7 September 2016.

UK Independence Party (UKIP)
On 6 January 2017 UKIP confirmed Pete Durnell as their candidate. Durnell stood for the party in the West Midlands police and crime commissioner election in 2016.

Results by local authority

Birmingham

Coventry

Dudley

Sandwell

Solihull

Walsall

Wolverhampton

References

2017 English local elections
Elections in the West Midlands (county)
Mayoral elections in England
May 2017 events in the United Kingdom
2010s in the West Midlands (county)